Santo Tomás is a town in southern Peru, capital of Chumbivilcas Province in Cusco Region.

Populated places in the Cusco Region